Mohamed Ali Ben Salem (born 6 January 1996) is a Tunisian professional footballer who plays as a centre-back for Uzbekistan Premier League club AGMK.

Club career 
On 1 March 2021 he signed for Ukrainian Premier League club Inhulets Petrove.

Career statistics

Club

References

1996 births
Living people
Tunisian footballers
Tunisian expatriate footballers
Association football defenders
Club Africain players
Olympique Béja players
ES Métlaoui players
FC Inhulets Petrove players
Tunisian Ligue Professionnelle 1 players
Ukrainian Premier League players
Expatriate footballers in Ukraine
Tunisian expatriate sportspeople in Ukraine
Tunisia youth international footballers